Srećko Puntarić (born ) is a Croatian cartoonist. He is best known for his regular comic "Felix" in the Croatian daily Večernji list, but has had his comic strips published in nearly every Croatian newspaper.

Biography 

He was born on 19 May 1952 in Zagreb. In 1978 he graduated at the Faculty of Mechanical Engineering and Naval Architecture in Zagreb.

References 

Croatian caricaturists
1952 births
Living people
Artists from Zagreb
University of Zagreb alumni